Miguel González Bastón (born 29 June 1961) is a Spanish former footballer who played as a goalkeeper.

Playing career
Born in Marín, Pontevedra, Galicia, Bastón began his career with Atlético Madrid, playing in its reserve side in the Segunda División. His opportunities were limited due to the presence of Eduardo Belza, Ángel Mejías and Abel Resino, and he signed with Real Burgos CF in 1984, where in the 1989–90 season he won the Ricardo Zamora Trophy and helped his team gain promotion to La Liga as champions.

Bastón played the first of his ten games in the Spanish top flight on 2 September 1990, in a 1–0 home win against Cádiz CF. In the summer of 1994, after the club dropped two levels in just two years, subsequently folding, the 33-year-old joined G.D. Chaves of the Portuguese Primeira Liga, retiring at the end of the 1994–95 campaign.

Coaching career
On 20 January 2011, Bastón returned to Atlético B as well as the C team as goalkeeping coach, when his former teammate Mejías left for Beşiktaş JK.

Personal life
Bastón's son, Borja, was also a footballer. A striker, he too came through Atlético's youth system; although not one of his legal surnames, Borja is also known as Bastón.

Honours
Burgos
Segunda División: 1989–90
Tercera División: 1984–85

Individual
Ricardo Zamora Trophy (Segunda División): 1989–90

References

External links

Living people
1961 births
Spanish footballers
Footballers from Marín, Pontevedra
Association football goalkeepers
La Liga players
Segunda División players
Segunda División B players
Tercera División players
Atlético Madrid B players
Real Burgos CF footballers
Primeira Liga players
G.D. Chaves players
Spanish expatriate footballers
Expatriate footballers in Portugal
Spanish expatriate sportspeople in Portugal